Émile Eugène Gontier (14 November 1877 in Argenteuil – 1947) was a French track and field athlete who competed at the 1900 Summer Olympics in Paris, France. Gontier competed in the pole vault, tying for fourth place by clearing 3.10 metres.  He also placed thirteenth in the discus throw.

References

Sources
 De Wael, Herman. Herman's Full Olympians: "Athletics 1900". Accessed 18 March 2006.

External links 

 

1877 births
1947 deaths
French male pole vaulters
French male discus throwers
Olympic athletes of France
Athletes (track and field) at the 1900 Summer Olympics
Sportspeople from Argenteuil
Date of death missing
Place of death missing